Lorraine Smith Pangle (born April 26, 1958) is a professor of political philosophy in the Department of Government and co-director of the Thomas Jefferson Center for the Study of Core Texts and Ideas at the University of Texas at Austin. Her interests are ancient, early modern, and American political philosophy, ethics, the philosophy of education, and problems of justice and moral responsibility.
She has won fellowships from the Searle, Olin, and Earhart Foundations, the Social Sciences and Humanities Research Council of Canada, and the National Endowment for the Humanities.
Pangle received her B.A. in history from Yale, a B.Ed. from the University of Toronto, and her PhD from University of Chicago in 1999. 
She is married to Thomas Pangle.

Books
 Virtue Is Knowledge: The Moral Foundations of Socratic Political Philosophy, University of Chicago Press, 2014
 The Political Philosophy of Benjamin Franklin (The Political Philosophy of the American Founders), Johns Hopkins, 2007
 Aristotle and the Philosophy of Friendship, Cambridge, 2003
 The Learning of Liberty: The Educational Ideas of the American Founders (with Thomas Pangle). University Press of Kansas, 1993

See also
Benjamin Franklin
Aristotelian ethics
Moral intellectualism

References

External links
 Pangle at University of Texas

21st-century American philosophers
Political philosophers
Philosophy academics
Philosophers of love
Living people
Academic staff of the University of Toronto
University of Texas at Austin faculty
University of Chicago alumni
Yale University alumni
University of Toronto alumni
1958 births